Gakuden Station is the name of two train stations in Japan:

 Gakuden Station (Hokkaidō) (学田駅)
 Gakuden Station (Aichi) (楽田駅)